In ancient Rome, the lex Fufia Caninia (also Furia ~ or Fusia ~, 2 BC) was one of the laws that national assemblies had to pass, after they were requested to do so by Augustus. This law, along with the lex Aelia Sentia, placed limitations on manumissions, as to how many slaves could be freed at one time. In numerical terms, this meant that a master who had three slaves could free only two; one who had between four and ten could free only half of them; one with eleven to thirty could free only a third, and so on. Manumissions above these limits were not valid.

The limitations were established at the end of the Republic and the beginning of the Empire, at a time when the number of manumissions was so large that they were perceived as a challenge to a social system that was founded on slavery.

References

Relevant articles 
 Roman Law
 Status in Roman legal system
 List of Roman laws
 Lex Aelia Sentia

External links 
 The Roman Law Library, incl. Leges

2 BC
1st century BC in law
Roman law